Education in South Africa is governed by two national departments, namely the Department of Basic Education (DBE), which is responsible for primary and secondary schools, and the Department of Higher Education and Training (DHET), which is responsible for tertiary education and vocational training. Prior to 2009, both departments were represented in a single Department of Education. Among sub-Saharan African countries, South Africa has one of the highest literacy rates. According to The World Factbook - Central Intelligence Agency as of 2019, 95% of the population age 15 and over can read and write in South Africa were respectively literate.

The DBE department deals with public schools, private schools (also referred to by the department as independent schools), early childhood development (ECD) centres, and special needs schools. The public schools and private schools are collectively known as ordinary schools, which are roughly 97% of schools in South Africa.

The DHET department deals with further education and training (FET) colleges now known as Technical and Vocational Education and Training (TVET) colleges, adult basic education and training (ABET) centres, and higher education (HE) institutions.

The nine provinces of South Africa also have their own education departments that are responsible for implementing the policies of the national department and dealing with local issues.

In 2010, the basic education system comprised 12,644,208 learners, 30,586 schools, and 439,394 teachers. In 2009, the higher education and training system comprised 837,779 students in HE institutions, 420,475 students in state-controlled FET institutions and 297,900 in state-controlled ABET centres.

In 2013, the South African government spent 21% of the national budget on education. Some 10% of the education budget is for higher education.

The Human Rights Measurement Initiative (HRMI) finds that South Africa is fulfilling only 72.1% of what it should be fulfilling for the right to education based on the country's level of income. HRMI breaks down the right to education by looking at the rights to both primary education and secondary education. While taking into consideration South Africa's income level, the nation is achieving 70.4% of what should be possible based on its resources (income) for primary education and 73.8% for secondary education.

Structure and policies
The Department of Basic Education is headed by the director-general, Hubert Mathanzima Mweli, and its policy is made by the minister Angie Motshekga and the deputy minister Reginah Mhaule. The department of Higher Education and Training is headed by the director-general, Gwebs Qonde, and its policy is made by the minister Blade Nzimande and the deputy minister Buti Manamela.

Both departments are funded from central government taxes. The department of Basic Education pays a portion of teachers' salaries in government schools, but independent schools are funded privately.  Government schools may, under certain circumstances, supplement their funds through parent contributions.
.
Normally the School Governing Body (SGB) is responsible for fundraising in schools. The School Governing Body in primary schools consists of parents, teachers and the support staff. In high school, it consists of parents, teachers, support staff and learners.

Basic education system (primary and secondary schools) 

The DBE officially groups grades into two "bands" called General Education and Training (GET), which includes grade 0 plus grades 1 to 9, and Further Education and Training (FET), which includes grades 10-12 as well as non-higher education vocational training facilities.

The GET (General Education and Training band) is subdivided further into "phases" called the Foundation Phase (grade 0 plus grade 1 to 3), the Intermediate Phase (grades 4 to 6), and the Senior Phase (grades 7 to 9).

The administrative structure of most ordinary schools in South Africa do not reflect the division of bands and phases, however.  For historical reasons, most schools are either "primary" schools (grade R plus grades 1 to 7) or "secondary" schools, also known as high schools (grades 8 to 12).

Optional grades 
Some home schools and private schools offer the option to complete an additional year after grade 12, sometimes known as grade 13 or "post-matric".  The South African governmental school system does not have a grade 13, but it forms part of non-South African curriculums that are sometimes followed by private schools in South Africa.

The DBE's Foundation Phase includes a pre-school grade known as grade R, for "reception".  Grade R is compulsory, but not all primary schools offer grade R.  Grade R may also be attended at pre-school facilities.  Other grades that can be completed at a pre-school centre include grade 00 and grade 000 (although the 000 and 00 designations are not universally applied). Grade R is sometimes called Grade 0 (pronounced "grade nought"), particularly in previously white schools, where the usage was once common.

Learner ratios 
According to the DBE's 2010 statistics report (published in 2012), on average there are 30 learners per teacher, 480 learners per school, and 16 teachers per school.  The ratio of learners per teacher is roughly the same in all provinces, but the ratio of learners per school varies per province.  For example, in Gauteng there are 800 learners per school and 28 teachers per school, whereas in the Eastern Cape there are 350 learners per school and 12 teachers per school.

Updated 2013 statistics (published in 2015) is available.

School income and expenses 
Schools in South Africa receive a grant from government for their operational costs, such as maintaining the grounds, administrative costs, salaries, books and educational materials, and extramural activities. Most schools supplement the government grant with other streams of income, such as school fees paid by parents, fundraising events, and receiving donations.
Generally, higher school fees prevent poorer children from attending affluent schools. There is no limit to the amount of the fees that a school may set.  Parents may apply to the school for full or partial reduction of school fees. Many affluent schools provide financial assistance to a small number of learners (for example, if the parents are alumni), but it is not a legal requirement.

Children at South African Schools are usually required to purchase and wear school uniforms although it is often possible to buy them second-hand. Most schools offer extramural activities such as a variety of sports and cultural activities, which require money to maintain. Many schools maintain their own sports fields as well.

The size of the grant paid by government is determined largely by the poverty level of the neighbourhood in which the school is situated, as well as unemployment rate and the general education rate of the population in that neighbourhood.  Consequently, schools in more affluent areas must raise more money from other sources to maintain the same standard of education, but schools from affluent areas often have so much additional income that their standard of education is much higher than that of less affluent schools anyway.

The size of the government grant per child depends on the "quintille" of the school. In 2009, schools in quintille 1 (the poorest) and quintille 2 received R807 and R740 per child per year, respectively, and as schools in quintille 4 and quintile 5 (the richest) received R404 and R134 per child per year. Schools in quintile 1-3 may apply for classification as a "No Fee" school; 5% of all schools are quintille 5 schools, and 15% of all schools are quintille 4 schools.

Sample school fees 
Schools are not required to publish their school fees publicly, and many schools are secretive about it, but here are some examples of school fees in non-private schools in South Africa:

  The Settler's High, Bellville: R15200 per child per year
 Monument Park High, Kraaifontein: R9000 per child per year

Poverty and school fees 
Schools may not refuse admission to children who live in the immediate vicinity of the school.  Schools may not refuse entry to children or refuse to hand over report cards even if their parents neglect to pay the school fees, but schools are permitted to sue parents for nonpayment of school fees.

Since 1996, children whose parents are very poor are legally exempt from some or all school fees.  Since 1998, the formula is as follows. If the combined annual income of the parents is less than ten times the annual school fee, the child is legally exempt. If the income is more than ten times the school fee but less than thirty times the school fee, the child is legally entitled to a specific reduction in school fees.  In practice, those regulations help only very poor families, not working-class and middle-income families.

Orphans and children of parents who receive poverty-linked social grants are also exempt from paying school fees.

Since 2006, the Education Department offers the following incentive to the poorest 40% of schools. If the school charges no school fees, the education department increases the grant to make up for the lack of income from school fees. It was originally planned to increase this incentive to the poorest 60% of schools by 2009. The incentive applies only to children in the GED band, and children who wish to complete grade 10-12 must still pay the full fee.

In 2008, some 5 million learners in 14,264 schools benefited from the No Fee school program, and most of them were in the Eastern Cape, KwaZulu-Natal and Limpopo Provinces. Not all schools that qualify for the incentive make use of it.

Private schools 

Private schools, also known as independent schools, are schools that are not owned by the state. They are usually owned and operated by a trust, church or community, or by a for-profit company. Not all private schools in South Africa charge high school fees. Certain private schools also receive a grant from the state, depending on the community served and fees charged.

Higher education and training system 

For university entrance, a "Matriculation Endorsement" is required, although some universities do set their own additional academic requirements. South Africa has a vibrant higher sector, with more than a million students enrolled in the country's universities, colleges and universities of technology. All the universities are autonomous, reporting to their own councils rather than government.  The National Qualifications Framework (NQF) system of administering higher education broadly in the country is run by the South African Qualifications Authority.

Graduate unemployment and underemployment are continuing problems, since most students continue to enroll for the humanities, arts, and social sciences. Too few students are choosing to study high-demand subjects such as education, health care, business, STEM subjects, and the skilled trades.

Restructuring of universities and technikons 
The Extension of Universities Act of 1959 made provision for separate universities for separate races.  In addition, the independent homelands were given universities of their own.  After the re-incorporation of the independent homelands, there were 36 universities and technikons in South Africa, often in close proximity and offering the same courses.

In 1994, the government embarked on a restructure of the universities and technikons by a series of mergers and incorporations. This was completed by January 2005.  It created 22 new institutions from the previous 36.  Ten of the universities got new names.

History

1652 to 1900 
The earliest European schools in South Africa were established in the Dutch Cape Colony in the late seventeenth century by Dutch Reformed Church elders committed to biblical instruction, which was necessary for church confirmation. In rural areas, itinerant teachers (meesters) taught basic literacy and math skills. British mission schools proliferated after 1799, when the first members of the London Missionary Society arrived in the Cape Colony.

Language soon became a sensitive issue in education. At least two dozen English-language schools operated in rural areas of the British Cape Colony by 1827, but their presence rankled among some members of the Dutch-speaking community, who considered the English language and curriculum irrelevant to rural life and their values. Throughout the nineteenth century, Dutch farmers resisted government policies aimed at the spread of the English language and British values, and many educated their children at home or in the churches.

After British colonial officials began encouraging families to emigrate from Britain to the Cape Colony in 1820, the Colonial Office screened applicants for immigration for background qualifications. They selected educated families, for the most part, to establish a British presence in the Cape Colony. After their arrival, these parents placed a high priority on education. Throughout this time, most religious schools in the Eastern Cape accepted Xhosa children who applied for admission; in Natal many other Nguni-speaking groups sent their children to mission schools after the mid-nineteenth century. The government also financed teacher training classes for Africans as part of its pacification campaign throughout the nineteenth century.

By 1877 some 60 percent of white school-age children in Natal were enrolled in school, as were 49 percent in the Cape Colony. After the Boer War (ended 1902) in the former Afrikaner republics, however, enrolments remained low—only 12 percent in the Orange Free State and 8 percent in the Transvaal—primarily the result of Afrikaner resistance to British education. Enrolments in these republics increased after the government of the Union agreed to the use of Afrikaans in the schools and to allow Afrikaner parents greater control over primary and secondary education.

By the late nineteenth century, three types of schools were receiving government assistance—ward schools, or small rural schools generally employing one teacher; district schools, providing primary-level education to several towns in an area; and a few secondary schools in larger cities. But during the last decades of that century, all four provinces virtually abolished African enrolment in government schools. African children attended mission schools, for the most part, and were taught by clergy or by lay teachers, sometimes with government assistance.

Higher education was generally reserved for those who could travel to Europe, but in 1829 the government established the multiracial South African College, which later split into the University of Cape Town and the South African College Schools . Religious seminaries accepted a few African applicants as early as 1841. In 1852 the independent South African Republic and in 1854 the Orange Free State established their own institutions of higher learning in Dutch. The government established Grey College—later the University of the Orange Free State—in Bloemfontein in 1855 and placed it under the supervision of the Dutch Reformed Church. The Grey Institute was established in Port Elizabeth in 1856; Graaff-Reinet College was founded in 1860. The Christian College was founded at Potchefstroom in 1869 and was later incorporated into the University of South Africa and renamed Potchefstroom University for Christian Higher Education.

1900 to 1948 
Following the British victory in the South African War, the British High Commissioner for Southern Africa, Sir Alfred Milner, brought thousands of teachers from across the British Empire to instil the English language and British cultural values, especially in the two former Boer Republics. To counter the British influence, a group of Afrikaner churches proposed an education program, Christian National Education, to serve as the core of the school curriculum. The government initially refused to fund schools adopting this program, but Jan C. Smuts, the Transvaal leader who later became Prime Minister, was strongly committed to reconciliation between Afrikaners and English speakers; he favoured local control over many aspects of education. Provincial autonomy in education was strengthened in the early twentieth century, and all four provincial governments used government funds primarily to educate whites.

The National Party (NP) was able to capitalise on the fear of racial integration in the schools to build its support. The NP's narrow election victory in 1948 gave Afrikaans new standing in the schools and, after that, all high-school graduates were required to be proficient in Afrikaans and English. The NP government also reintroduced Christian National Education as the guiding philosophy of education.

1948 to 1974 
Before 1953, many black people attended schools set up by religious organizations. These schools provided schooling of the same quality that white children received in state schools. This changed after the Eiselen Commission recommended establishing a separate education system for blacks under the Ministry of Native Affairs. Minister of Native Affairs and future Prime Minister Hendrik Verwoerd designed Bantu education to teach African culture and educate Africans "in accordance with their opportunities in life." Following the Bantu Education Act (No. 47) of 1953 the government tightened its control over religious high schools by eliminating almost all financial aid, forcing many churches to sell their schools to the government or close them entirely.

The South African government implemented an education system called Christian National Education (CNE). The basis of this system is that a person's social responsibilities and political opportunities are defined by that person's ethnic identity.

Although CNE advanced principles of racial inferiority, it promoted teaching of cultural diversity and enforced mother-tongue instruction in the first years of primary school. The government gave strong management control to the school boards, who were elected by the parents in each district.

In 1959, the Extension of University Education Act prohibited established universities from accepting most black students, although the government did create universities for black, coloured, and Indian students.

The number of schools for blacks increased during the 1960s, but their curriculum was designed to prepare children for menial jobs. Per capita government spending on black education slipped to one-tenth of spending on whites in the 1970s. Black schools had inferior facilities, teachers, and textbooks.

1974 to 1983
In 1974, the Minister of Bantu Education and Development issued a decree commonly known as the "Afrikaans medium decree" in which the use of both English and Afrikaans was made compulsory in black secondary schools. In this decree, physical science and practical subjects would be taught in English, mathematics and social science subjects would be taught in Afrikaans, and music and cultural subjects would be taught in the learner's native language. The Minister said that the reason for this decree was to ensure that black people can communicate effectively with English and Afrikaans speaking white people.

This decree was unpopular with learners and teachers alike, particularly in towns like the Johannesburg township of Soweto, where practically no one spoke Afrikaans. Tensions over language in education erupted into violence on of 16 June 1976, when students took to the streets in Soweto and eventually in other towns and cities in the country. This is known as the Soweto Uprising, when students and those able to take a stand demanded to be taught in their mother tongue. Many were killed and injured that day due to police intervention. They are remembered as martyrs. Schools were vandalized and teachers left unable to teach and students were unable to come to school.

1984 to 1990 
The National Policy for General Affairs Act (No. 76) of 1984 provided some improvements in black education but maintained the overall separation called for by the Bantu education system.

The Department of Education and Training was responsible for black education outside the bantustans. Each of the three houses of the Tricameral Parliament—for whites, coloureds, and Indians—had an education department for one racial group. Each of the ten homelands had its own education department. In addition, several other government departments managed specific aspects of education.

Education was compulsory for all racial groups, but at different ages, and the law was enforced differently. Whites were required to attend school between the ages of seven and sixteen. Black children were required to attend school from age seven until the equivalent of seventh grade or the age of sixteen. This law was enforced only weakly and not at all in areas where schools were unavailable. For Asians and coloured children, education was compulsory between the ages of seven and fifteen.

Teacher-pupil ratios in primary schools averaged 1:18 in white schools, 1:24 in Asian schools, 1:27 in coloured schools, and 1:39 in black schools. Moreover, whereas 96 percent of all teachers in white schools had teaching certificates, only 15 percent of teachers in black schools were certified. Secondary-school pass rates for black pupils in the nationwide, standardised high-school graduation exams were less than one-half the pass rate for whites.

1990 to 1993
The white education system was restructured, in anticipation of democracy, by the apartheid government. From the beginning of 1991, white schools were required to select one of four "Models": A, B, C, or D. "Model C" was a semi-private structure, with decreased funding from the state, and greatly increased autonomy for schools. Although most white schools opted for the status quo, by 1993, due to government policy, 96% of white public schools became "Model C" schools.

Although the form of "Model C" was abolished by the post-apartheid government, the term is still commonly used to describe former whites-only government schools, as of 2013.

1994 to 2022
Under Apartheid South Africa, there were eight education departments that followed different curricula and offered different standards of learning quality. This included nationwide departments for coloured people, for Indians and for black people, a department for independent schools, and provincial departments for white people in each of the former four provinces. Some of the Bantustans that were incorporated back into South Africa in 1994 also had their own education departments.

In terms of the Interim Constitution, the Mandela government restructured these departments as well as tertiary education departments, splitting responsibilities between nine newly formed provincial education departments and a single national education department. It also set about reforming the educational system by first removing all racially offensive and outdated content and then introducing continuous assessment into schools.

The South African Schools Act, 1996 was promulgated to "provide for a uniform system for the organisation, governance and funding of schools".

1997 to 2005
In 1997, the government launched its new education system called Curriculum 2005, which would be based on "outcomes based education" (OBE). By 2006 it was clear that OBE as a social experiment had failed, and it was quietly shelved.

2006 until now - use of English 
South Africa has 11 official languages. and the first year of schooling is provided in all these home languages.

Before 2009, schools serving non-English speakers had to teach English as a subject only from grade 3 and all subjects were taught in English from grade 4 (except in Afrikaans language schools). Since 2009, all schools teach English as a subject from grade 1 and all subjects are taught in English from grade 4. Afrikaans language schools are an exception, in that all subjects (other than other languages) are taught in Afrikaans.

In December 2019 the Eastern Cape Division of the High Court of South Africa ruled against the ban of children without birth certificates from receiving basic education in South Africa. The court ruled that "It is an important socioeconomic right directed, among other things, at promoting and developing a child's personality, talents and mental and physical abilities to his or her fullest potential" and that "Basic education also provides a foundation for a child's lifetime learning and work opportunities."

Performance 
An independent study by Stellenbosch University researchers found that undue union influence and "critical educational factors", including weak institutional functionality, uneducated teachers and insufficient learning time, were responsible for poor academic performance in South Africa. Due to poor academic performance, teen pregnancy and crime the country has a high dropout rate. In 2020 seven Limpopo schools (down from 9 the previous year, and among 18 nationwide) obtained a 0% pass rate in the National Senior Certificate exams. The locally dismal performance was ascribed to uncommitted teachers, proximity of schools to taverns, inactive governing bodies and the apartheid legacy.

Violence
The South African Human Rights Commission has found that 40% of children interviewed said they had been the victims of crime at school. More than a fifth of sexual assaults on South African children were found to have taken place in schools. Gang fighting in schools, whereby dangerous weapons which include guns, are used, has also become popular in recent years, specifically in Cape Town, Western Cape.

The Education Department and the Centre for Justice and Crime Prevention initiated a program named Hlayiseka, the purpose of which is to curb the epidemic of school violence in South African schools.

References

Further reading

External links
(Ministry) Department of Basic Education
(Ministry) Department of Higher Education and Training
(Ministry) Department of Science and Technology

 
History of the Dutch East India Company